The November 2008 Dera Ismail Khan bombing took place on November 21, 2008 at Bannu Ada in Dera Ismail Khan ,  killing 8.

Sectarianism in the city rose in 2007-2009 span. More than 8 people died each month from sectarian violence. The November 2008 bombing was part of series of attacks against Shi'i. The August 2008 Dera Ismail Khan suicide bombing was also against Shi'i.

Attack

Earlier incidents 
On the night before, Shahid Iqbal Husain Shah, a civilian, was killed. An hour before the attack, Nazeer Husain Shah, a Shi'ite scholar, was shot dead, while another Shi'ite Ali Gohar was wounded by unknown gunmen. Shahid Iqbal was brought to District Headquarters Hospital, where he died from his wounds.

Bombing 
When Shahid Iqbal's funeral reached Bannu Adda, a roadside bomb exploded. Injures were brought to District Headquarters Hospital. Eyewitnesses reported gunshots after the bombing..

References 

2008 murders in Pakistan
21st-century mass murder in Pakistan
Terrorist incidents in Dera Ismail Khan
Islamic terrorist incidents in 2008
Terrorist incidents in Pakistan in 2008
November 2008 events in Pakistan